Ravnik is a village north of Nova Vas in the Municipality of Bloke in the Inner Carniola region of Slovenia.

The local church in the settlement is dedicated to Saint Roch and belongs to the Parish of Bloke.

References

External links

Ravnik on Geopedia

Populated places in the Municipality of Bloke